No Kidding is a 1960 British comedy film directed by Gerald Thomas featuring Leslie Phillips, Geraldine McEwan and Irene Handl, Noel Purcell and Julia Lockwood. The film is adapted from Verily Anderson's 1958 memoir Beware of Children, under which title the film was released in the US. Anderson also wrote the screenplay.

The film has been interpreted by film scholar Wheeler Dixon as "a gentle critique of A. S. Neill's Summerhill, whose theories were published in America in the same year as the film's release, by the Hart Publishing Company.

Harrison's Reports gave it a good review, calling it an "uneven but well-enacted comedy by the 'Carry On ...' series film-makers.... Unobjectionable for all." Elsewhere it is described as "surprisingly sophisticated fare that also scores a number of interesting points about greed, privilege and class."

Plot
David (Leslie Phillips) and Catherine Robinson (Geraldine McEwan) have inherited a large but rundown country house. David suggests they now have room to increase their family beyond their son, but, after a number of his previous business ventures have failed, his wife demurs. However, she does agree to his idea to use the house as a summer holiday home for the children of the wealthy. By advertising in The Times, they attract a number of customers, and hire a matron (June Jago) and a cook (Joan Hickson), but immediately fall foul of a local councillor, Mrs Spicer (Irene Handl), who wants the local authority to compulsorily purchase the house for a project of her own.

The children arrive, and while some are polite, scared and helpful, others are wild, spoilt, and rebellious, including an American brother and sister, and an English girl (Julia Lockwood) who insists (falsely) that she has been maltreated by her parents.

As the children grow increasingly ill-disciplined, the Robinsons and the staff struggle to keep them under control. David advocates a tough approach, while Catherine believes that the children should be allowed their freedom, but they are both undermined by a cook who is drunk most of the time.

After an illicit midnight trip out to a nearby café, the children are grounded for two days. Then the Robinsons hear that the local council is sending an inspector, who may close them down if they fail the test. They rally the staff and children, who all behave correctly when the inspector and Mrs Spicer visit.

When the time arrives for the children's parents to come to collect them, David tells them that the children are refusing to leave unless their parents promise to spend more time with them and not send them away to holiday homes and boarding schools. After the parents agree, all the children depart. Impressed by what she has seen, Mrs Spicer says she will no longer oppose the holiday home business. When their son protests at having lost his playmates, Catherine tells David that perhaps they should now have more children of their own.

Cast

 Leslie Phillips as David Robinson
 Geraldine McEwan as Catherine Robinson
 Julia Lockwood as Fenella / "Vanilla"
 Irene Handl as Mrs Spicer
 Noel Purcell as Tandy
 Joan Hickson as Cook
 June Jago as Matron
 Cyril Raymond as Colonel Matthews
 Esma Cannon as District Nurse
 Alan Gifford as Edgar Treadgold
 Sydney Tafler as Mr Rockbottom
 Brian Oulton as Vicar
 Eric Pohlmann as King
 Patricia Jessel as Queen
 Brian Rawlinson as Will
 Michael Sarne as Henri
 Joy Shelton as Mrs Rockbottom
 Earl Cameron as Black father
 Pearl Prescod as Black mother
 Peter Howell as father of Angus
 Marion Mathie as Helen Treadgold
 Peggy Simpson as mother of Angus
 Noel Hood as Vicar's wife
 Cyril Chamberlain as Cafe proprietor
 Christopher Witty as Richard Robinson
 Martin Stephens as Angus
 Francesca Annis as Priscilla
 Haydn Evans as Lionel Rockbottom
 Michael Gowdy as Dandy Big Treadgold
 Janet Bradbury (as Jeanette Bradbury) as Dandy Little Treadgold 
 Keith Lacey as Hassan
 Mark Milleham as Suleiman
 Millicent Kerr as Eileen
 Louise Redman as Margaret

References

External links

 "No Kidding (1960)", with clip from the film. Summer Camp Culture.

1960 films
Films directed by Gerald Thomas
1960 comedy films
Films based on British novels
British comedy films
1960s English-language films
Films shot at Pinewood Studios
Films with screenplays by Norman Hudis
Films produced by Peter Rogers
1960s British films